Doto pita is a species of sea slug, a small nudibranch, a shell-less marine gastropod mollusc in the family Dotidae.

Distribution
Doto pita occurs in the Caribbean Sea and tropical west Atlantic Ocean, from Brazil to Florida.  Reports from Japan, and New Zealand, may be the result of accidental transport by human agency or simply misidentifications.

Description
The body is translucent white with some brown spots at the bases of the cerata. The digestive gland is cream and the cerata are rather irregular in appearance.

The maximum recorded body length is 7 mm.

Habitat 
Minimum recorded depth is 0 m. Maximum recorded depth is 25 m.

References

External links
  Burn R. (2006) A checklist and bibliography of the Opisthobranchia (Mollusca: Gastropoda) of Victoria and the Bass Strait area, south-eastern Australia. Museum Victoria Science Reports 10:1–42
 

Dotidae
Gastropods described in 1955
Taxa named by Ernst Marcus (zoologist)